'Kottikkulam Railway Station 0467 223 6245 udma .671319   is a small village in Kasaragod district  Kerala state.

Location
Kottikkulam is a village near Bekal fort. Udma 671319  It lies 13 km north of Kanhangad town and 19 km south of Kasaragod town.

See also
 Kotikulam railway station

References
671319
Villages in Kasaragod district